Aleksey Shalashnikov (born 22 March 2002) is a Belarusian professional footballer who plays for Slavia Mozyr on loan from BATE Borisov.

References

External links 
 
 

2002 births
Living people
Belarusian footballers
Association football defenders
FC BATE Borisov players
FC Isloch Minsk Raion players
FC Neman Grodno players
FC Slavia Mozyr players